Sam Aaron Garnes (born July 12, 1974) is a former professional American football defensive back and coach and current radio personality on The Ryan Show FM.

He was selected by the New York Giants in the 5th round of the 1997 NFL Draft. A native of the Bronx, Garnes is an alumnus of John Philip Sousa Junior High School located in the Edenwald section of that borough. Garnes currently resides in Fort Lee, New Jersey.

In 2011, Garnes became an assistant secondary coach for the Denver Broncos.

The Broncos’ secondary in 2013 overcame numerous injuries to its personnel, including extended periods without 12-time Pro Bowl cornerback Champ Bailey and starting safety Rahim Moore. In their absence, cornerback Chris Harris Jr. became a steadying force on the outside and second-year safety Duke Ihenacho emerged as solid contributor in the defensive backfield.

He joined the Chicago Bears' coaching staff as an assistant secondary coach in 2015, but was let go after the 2016 season.

In 2019 he became a Sports Analyst on the nationally syndicated radio program, The Ryan Show FM.

References

External links
Interview with Sam Garnes, 12 May 2007
Carolina Panthers cornerback Munnerlyn takes advantage of a larger role, 1 May 2010

1974 births
Living people
Sportspeople from the Bronx
Players of American football from New York City
People from West Milford, New Jersey
American football safeties
New York Giants players
New York Jets players
Cincinnati Bearcats football players
Las Vegas Locomotives coaches
Carolina Panthers coaches
Chicago Bears coaches
Denver Broncos coaches
DeWitt Clinton High School alumni